Lasqueti Island/False Bay Water Aerodrome  is located adjacent to Lasqueti Island, British Columbia, Canada.

See also
 List of airports in the Gulf Islands

References

Seaplane bases in British Columbia
Qathet Regional District
Registered aerodromes in British Columbia
Airports in the Gulf Islands